Sir Archibald Richard Park  (18 September 1888 – 18 November 1959) was an Australian politician.

He was born in Wallsend in New South Wales. In 1949 he was elected to the Tasmanian House of Assembly as a Liberal member for Franklin. He held the seat until his resignation in 1955, the year in which he was appointed Companion of the Order of St Michael and St George. He served as Lord Mayor of Hobart from 1954 to 1959. Knighted in 1958, he was re-elected to the House as a member for Denison in 1959, but died in November of that year.

References

1888 births
1959 deaths
Liberal Party of Australia members of the Parliament of Tasmania
Members of the Tasmanian House of Assembly
Companions of the Order of St Michael and St George
Australian Knights Bachelor
People from New South Wales
20th-century Australian politicians
Tasmanian local councillors